Socorro de la Cruz (1922–1988), or much popularly known as Aruray, was a Filipino comedienne who made many movies produced by her home studio Sampaguita Pictures. She was one of the most successful comedians of the 1950s until 1980s, and was often partnered with Chichay, another famous comedienne, of that time.
She was from Calamba, Laguna and her parents were Braulio de la Cruz and Eusebia Diaz.

Filmography
1946 - Hanggang Pier
1949 - Damit Pangkasal - Sampaguita Pictures
1950 - Kundiman ng Luha - Balintawak Pictures
1950 - Campo O' Donnell - Sampaguita Pictures
1950 - 13 Hakbang - Sampaguita Pictures
1950 - Kay Ganda Mo Neneng - Sampaguita Pictures
1951 - Kasaysayan ni Dr. Ramon Selga - Sampaguita Pictures 
1951 - Roberta - Sampaguita Pictures 
1951 - Kasintahan sa Pangarap - Sampaguita Pictures 
1951 - Tres Muskiteros - Sampaguita Pictures
1952 - Mayamang Balo - Sampaguita Pictures
1952 - Lihim ng Kumpisalan - Sampaguita Pictures
1952 - Buhay Pilipino - Sampaguita Pictures
1953 - Munting Koronel - Sampaguita Pictures
1953 - Anak ng Espada - Sampaguita Pictures
1953 - Apat na Taga - Sampaguita Pictures
1953 - Sa Isang Sulyap Mo Tita - Sampaguita Pictures
1953 - Recuerdo - Sampaguita Pictures
1954 - Maalaala Mo Kaya - Sampaguita Pictures
1954 - Tres Muskiteras - Sampaguita Pictures
1954 - Matandang Dalaga - Sampaguita Pictures
1954 - MN - Sampaguita Pictures
1954 - Ang Biyenang Hindi Tumatawa - Sampaguita Pictures
1954 - Dumagit - Sampaguita Pictures
1954 - Kurdapya - Sampaguita Pictures
1955 - Lola Sinderella - Sampaguita Pictures
1955 - Mariposa - Sampaguita Pictures
1955 - Despatsadora - Sampaguita Pictures
1955 - Kontra Bida - Sampaguita Pictures
1955 - Bim Bam Bum - Sampaguita Pictures
1956 - Kanto Girl - Sampaguita Pictures
1958 - Glory at Dawn - PMP
1962 - Ang Pitong Atsay - Sampaguita Pictures
1962 - Ang Pinakamalaking Takas (Ng Pitong Atsay) - Sampaguita Pictures 
1963 - King and Queen for a Day1963 - Magic Bilao1964 - Libis ng Baryo1964 - Ang Senyorito at ang Atsay1964 - Ging''

External links

1922 births
1988 deaths
Filipino film actresses